The Gouverneur Correctional Facility is a medium-security state prison for men located in Gouverneur, St. Lawrence County, New York, owned and operated by the New York State Department of Corrections and Community Supervision.  The facility has a working capacity of 1075 inmates held at medium security.  By October 2013, the number of inmates had decreased to 800, overseen by 367 employees.

References

Prisons in New York (state)
Buildings and structures in St. Lawrence County, New York
1990 establishments in New York (state)